Mossy fiber may refer to two different bundles of axons in the brain:

 Mossy fiber (cerebellum)
 Mossy fiber (hippocampus)